Gambling in Macau has been legal since the 1850s when the Portuguese government legalised the activity in the autonomous colony. Since then, Macau has become known worldwide as the "Gambling capital of the world" or "Monte Carlo of the East".

Gambling tourism is Macau's biggest source of revenue, making up about 50% of the economy. Visitors are largely from mainland China and Hong Kong. With the entry of large foreign casinos from Las Vegas and Australia, Macau overtook the Las Vegas Strip in gambling revenues in 2007.

Until Western-style casino games were introduced in the 20th century, only Chinese games were played, the most popular being Fan-Tan. Generally, gambling in Macau can be divided into one of four categories: casino games, greyhound racing, sports betting, and lotteries. At the present time, Macau does not license online gambling operations.

Macau, a special administrative region like Hong Kong, is the only place in China where casinos are legal, and the business has grown at an astounding pace since 2001, when the government ended the four-decade gambling monopoly of the Hong Kong billionaire Stanley Ho.

Macau is the pre-eminent gambling capital of the world, grossing the highest amount of gambling/gaming revenue and greatly dwarfing all the other gambling centers/cities.

History 

In an attempt to generate revenues for the government, gambling in Macau was legalized by the Portuguese government in 1849. In the late 19th century, the government introduced a licensing system for the fantan houses (Chinese gambling houses). It is reported that over 200 gambling houses were required to pay gambling rent to the government. The second casino monopoly concession was granted to the Tai Heng Company in 1937. The company was, however, too conservative to fully exploit the economic potential of gambling.

The industry saw a major breakthrough in 1962 when the government granted the monopoly rights to all forms of gambling to Sociedade de Turismo e Diversões de Macau (STDM), a syndicate jointly formed by Hong Kong and Macanese businessmen. The STDM introduced Western-style games and modernised the marine transport between Macau and Hong Kong, bringing millions of gamblers from Hong Kong every year. The license was extended in 1986 for another 15 years but expired at the end of 2001.

Macau was transferred to the People's Republic of China in 1999 and became a special administrative region of China. During this transition, there were no changes to gambling policy in Macau.

In 2002, the Macau government ended the monopoly system and granted three (later six) casino operating concessions (and subconcessions) to: Sociedade de Jogos de Macau (SJM, an 80% owned subsidiary of STDM), Wynn Resorts, Las Vegas Sands, Galaxy Entertainment Group, the partnership of MGM Mirage and Pansy Ho Chiu-king, and the partnership of Melco and PBL. On 18 May 2004, the Sands Macau casino opened near the Macau Ferry Terminal. Today, there are 16 casinos operated by the STDM, and they are still crucial in the casino industry in Macau.

Economic aspects 

Macau's economy relies heavily on gambling. Nowadays, the gambling industry generates over 40% of the GDP of Macau. Since the early 1960s, around 50% of Macau's official revenue has been driven by gambling. The percentage remained steady until the late 1990s. In 1998, 44.5% of total government revenue was produced by the direct tax on gambling. Then there was a 9.1% decrease in 1999, probably due to internet gaming. After the handover of Macau from Portugal to China, the SAR released gambling licenses to other companies to eliminate the monopoly played by the STDM. In 2002, the government signed concession contracts with two Macau gaming companies, Wynn Resort Ltd. and Galaxy Casino. This opened the gambling market for competition and increased government tax revenue significantly. It also attracted more tourists to Macau. At this moment, according to official statistics, gambling taxes form 70% of Macau's government income.

However, the gambling industry is also a source of instability in the Macau economy, as the nature of the gambling business is not susceptible to technological advancement or productivity growth. The gambling business is still dependent on the prosperity of other Asian economies, especially that of China. Due to Xi Jinping's promise on cracking down of corruption across mainland China, casino profits from across Macau have been reporting a decline in monthly profits In addition, a proliferation of other gambling venues in the region is drawing the target demographic away. Macau's 2018 grew 13% over the prior year, but this lagged behind the 41% growth in emerging casino markets in Singapore, South Korea, the Philippines and Australia, according to Fitch Ratings. In 2019 casino earnings reached their lowest level in three years.<ref>{{cite news|title=Casino Boom in Asia Pressures Vegas Operators: Regions new venues aim to draw gamblers beyond Macau, U.S. giants' longtime hub |author=Ese Erheriene |work=The Wall Street Journal|page=B5 |date=7 May 2019}}</ref>

In 2020 Macau had a decline of 56 percent in revenue, and the number of monthly visitors fell from approximately 3 million before the COVID-19 pandemic to fewer than 1 million in 2021. The unemployment rate increased from an average of 2 percent over the past decade to 4.6 percent in the first quarter of 2022.

 Gambling forms 

 Casinos 
Macau has 41 casinos (as of 2019), of which the biggest is The Venetian Macao. Twenty-four casinos are located on the Macau Peninsula and 17 in Cotai. They all operate under a government franchise and under a common set of rules.

The main casino operators in Macau are SJM Holdings, Galaxy Entertainment and Las Vegas Sands with respective revenues of 9.7, 4.8, and 4.2 billion in 2011.

A wide range of games are available, including roulette, blackjack, baccarat, boule, Sic bo, Fan Tan, keno and slot machines.

Poker was introduced only in August 2007, in an electronic table format at Galaxy Starworld casino. The first live poker tournament was the Asia Pacific Poker Tour Macau event in November 2007. Shortly thereafter, in January 2008, the government of Macau published the official rules for Texas hold 'em poker games in Macau. In February 2008, Grand Lisboa Casino added the first live-dealer cash game tables. In May 2008, 'PokerStars Macau' opened at Grand Waldo Casino. In November 2008, Texas Holdem' Poker opened at Wynn Macau. 'PokerStars Macau' moved to a new location at the Grand Lisboa Casino in March 2009. Today, Wynn Macau, StarWorld, and the Venetian offer live-dealer cash game poker tables. Previously, most casinos were non-smoking. This caused serious discontent from both operators and visitors. In 2019, the Chinese Ministry of Health allowed smoking in special rooms in most casinos. In February 2020, in connection with the spread of coronavirus, after a two-week break in the casino, a restriction was introduced.

Location of the Race-course and the Canidrome

 Horse racing 
Other than casinos, there is betting at the Macau Jockey Club and the dog-racing Canidrome.

Horse-racing mainly takes place every Tuesday and Saturday or Sunday at the race-course on the Taipa Island of Macau. The race-course has an area of 450,000 square metres and 18,000 seats for gamblers, and is open only for people over 18 years of age.

The Macau Jockey Club was formerly the Macau Trotting Club. In 1991, it was acquired by a consortium led by Stanley Ho. The Macau Jockey Club is one of the largest private employers of Macau with around 1,400 employees and around 1,100 part-timers.

Ways of betting
On-course betting
There are over 210 betting terminals "on-course". All terminals can perform sell and pay functions. Punters may bet in Hong Kong dollars or Macau patacas. Bets are accepted up to the start of each race. Punters may place a bet by oral instructions or by filling a ticket.

Off-course betting
There are over 80 betting terminals in the Off-Course Betting Centres. 14 Off-course Betting Centres are located in popular districts of Macau and Taipa.

Internet betting
The Internet betting service commenced on 20 September 2003. Customers can review the Club's internet betting website at www.macauhorsebet.com.

Telephone services
There are over 600 telephone service terminals and a total of over 38,000 telebet accounts. The winning dividend of account holders may at their instructions be automatically transferred to their bank accounts.

Fast Access Terminals (FAT)
Launched in June 1997, the personal betting terminal, FAT (Fast Access Terminal) offers betting, calculation of bet units, record tracking of bets, account enquiry, withdrawal instructions and other related information on races such as declaration and race-odds. Close to 1,000 customers are currently using FAT.

Hong Kong Service Centres
Three service centres are now set up in Hong Kong including Shaukeiwan Service Centre, Sheung Wan Service Centre and Mongkok Service Centre.

 Greyhound racing 
Greyhound racing is permanently banned in Macau.

The Canidrome closed on 21 July 2018. After negotiations with the track's owner and intense fundraising by an international group of volunteer-run, greyhound adoption organizations led by Anima, 517 greyhounds received veterinary medical care and were shuttled out to be adopted in Europe, North America, Australia, and, for a few, locally in Macau. 

 Gaming law 

No one under the age of 21 is allowed to gamble.

Detailed law is enforced in Macau to ensure "qualified operation of gambling" in Macau. The details are listed in Law 16/2001 (regime jurídico da exploração de jogos de fortuna ou azar em casino), and other laws regulating the activity of gaming promoters and credit for gaming.

The Gaming Inspection and Coordination Bureau (known as DICJ) is the main government unit that oversees the operation of different gaming activities.

Under Macau law, it stated that a permit issued by the Gaming Inspection and Coordination Bureau is required for the operation of lotteries sales, lucky draw or similar activities, and the initial procedure in the application on the operation of lotteries sales, lucky draw, or similar activities is to submit a notification to the relevant government department ten days prior to the application.

In the Macau legal system, gaming law is not considered as a branch of law in the traditional sense. Instead, it may be considered as a transversal gathering of a range of legal topics more or less directly related to gaming, including constitutional law, administrative law, tax law, company law, contract law, and criminal law. In this manner, issues of public law as well as private law are of relevance for gaming.

 Tax law issues 
The taxation of casino sub/concessionaires is made of a fixed part and a variable part. The variable part falls on the gross gaming revenue. The tax rate is currently of 35%, plus two contributions of up to 2% and 3% for social and economic purposes. The maximum tax is therefore 40%. In addition, a fixed premium is also payable, plus a premium per VIP table, other table, and slot machine. Gaming promoters pay taxes on commissions received.

 Contract law issues 
From the perspective of contract law, gaming and betting are contracts which may or may not generate civil or natural obligations for the parties. The matter is regulated in the Civil Code 1999 (art. 1171), which states, drawing from Roman law, that gaming and betting generate natural obligations except in sports competitions and where the law provides otherwise. The problem is that gaming legislation currently does not provide to this effect.

Regarding credit for gaming, Macau law states since 2004 that the granting of credit for casino games of fortune generates civil obligations, which are fully enforceable in Macau courts. Credit for casino games of fortune is defined as any case where chips are passed on to a player without immediate cash payment of such chips; this is an intentionally broad concept. Credit for gaming is regulated by Law no. 5/2004, of 14 June.

 Criminal law issues 
From the perspective of criminal law, there are specific criminal offences related to gaming; see Law 8/96/M, of 22 July, and Law 9/96/M, of 22 July. Other criminal law matters are covered by broader laws: the Penal Code and the law on Organized crime. Game cheating is mentioned in art. 6 of Law 8/96/M, of 22 July.  In addition, general laws on the prevention and repression of money laundering and the financing of terrorism through casinos apply.

 Problem gambling 

As of November 2011, exclusion of players from gambling establishments is voluntary. If the person realises that their gambling activities begin to cause trouble, they can turn to the Gaming Inspection and Coordination Bureau to ban them from entering the casino. The government of Macau is seeking the opinions of the citizens on the possibility of establishing a programme that will allow excluding problem gamblers from all casinos without their consent. The Legislative Assembly is currently analyzing the new draft law, which also deals with the problem of exclusion from gambling houses. The law suggests that the person can be excluded from the casino if they submit their own request or approve the request submitted by their relatives.

 Other matters 
Competition law matters, and advertising law, as well as the impact of WTO law on gaming, may also be pointed out as part of gaming law. Regarding online gaming, the Macau SAR does not currently grant concessions for online casinos. The current casino concessions only cover land-based gaming, not online gaming.

 Academic research and teaching 
The teaching of Macau gaming law started in 2005 the Faculty of Business Administration of the University of Macau, in the undergraduate program of gaming management.
Since 2007 it is also included in the master program of international business law offered by the Faculty of Law of the University of Macau , in which various theses have already been defended in topics of gaming law.

 See also 
Cotai
Cotai Strip
List of Macau casinos

 References 

 Further reading 
 Jorge Godinho, 'Casino Gaming in Macau: Evolution, Regulation and Challenges', in UNLV Gaming Law Journal, vol. 5(1), 2014, pp. 1 ff. 
 Jorge Godinho, 'A History of Games of Chance in Macau: Part 1 – Introduction', in Gaming Law Review and Economics, vol. 16(10), October 2012, pp. 552 ff. 
 Jorge Godinho, Macau Business Law and Legal System, LexisNexis, Hong Kong, 2007 
 Governo de Macau, O Jogo em Macau, 1985.
 Angela Leong, 'The "bate-ficha" business and triads in Macau casinos', QUEENSLAND U. OF TECH. L. & JUST.'', 84 (2002)
 Metaxas Theodore and Folinas Sotiris (2016) "Gambling Tourism and Economic Development: Some lessons from Macao," MPRA Paper 72397, University Library of Munich, Germany.
Lou, Loretta (2021), "Casino capitalism in the era of COVID-19: examining Macau’s pandemic response", Social Transformations in Chinese Societies, Vol. 17 No. 2, pp. 69-79. https://doi.org/10.1108/STICS-09-2020-0025

External links